Jung Hyun (born June 1, 1994) is a baseball infielder for the SSG Landers of the KBO League. He graduated Busan High School. He joined the Samsung Lions in 2013, and in 2014 he transferred to KT Wiz.

References

External links 

 Jung Hyun on koreabaseball

1994 births
Living people
Baseball infielders
South Korean baseball players
KT Wiz players
Sportspeople from Busan